Mekides Abebe Demewoz (born 29 July 2001) is an Ethiopian athlete. She competed in the women's 3000 metres steeplechase event at the 2019 World Athletics Championships.

She won the gold medal in the women's 3000 metres steeplechase at the 2019 African Games and the silver medal in the women's 2000 metre steeplechase at the 2018 Youth Olympics.

She competed in the women's 3000 metres steeplechase at the 2020 Summer Olympics.

References

External links
 

2001 births
Living people
Ethiopian female middle-distance runners
Ethiopian female steeplechase runners
Place of birth missing (living people)
World Athletics Championships athletes for Ethiopia
Athletes (track and field) at the 2019 African Games
African Games medalists in athletics (track and field)
African Games gold medalists for Ethiopia
Athletes (track and field) at the 2018 Summer Youth Olympics
African Games gold medalists in athletics (track and field)
Athletes (track and field) at the 2020 Summer Olympics
Olympic athletes of Ethiopia
21st-century Ethiopian women